Colzium railway station served the area of Colzium, North Lanarkshire, Scotland from 1888 to 1917 on the Kilsyth and Bonnybridge Railway.

History 
The station opened on 2 July 1888 by the Kilsyth and Bonnybridge Railway. To the east was the goods shed and its three sidings. The station closed on 1 March 1917.

References

External links 

Disused railway stations in North Lanarkshire
Railway stations in Great Britain opened in 1888
Railway stations in Great Britain closed in 1917
1888 establishments in Scotland
1917 disestablishments in Scotland